Doug Chapman is a stunt coordinator, stunt performer and actor, a member of Stunts Canada, who works in film and television.

Biography
He graduated in 1994 from the California State University, Chico with a Bachelor of Arts in Information and Communication Design in Media Arts.

Career
He has been a stunt double for Kurt Russell, Robert Englund and Christian Slater. He worked on TV shows from The X-Files to Smallville, and films from I, Robot to 300. He has also performed stunts for many commercials, including precision driving for commercials for Honda and Chrysler. Notable acting roles include Sergeant Cole in Stargate Atlantis and Roy Chess in Watchmen. He has continued to work in stunt coordination and stunt performer roles in top TV series and films to date.

Chapman was uncredited for a stunt in the Smallville episode "Splinter", where he was a stunt double for James Marsters. In the DVD commentary, Marsters says of Chapman, "...he was supposed to just land on top of the thing and the wine case and then slowly go down, and he got sent straight through it...that was such a nasty gag... but he was fine man, he's a pro."

In the film Watchmen, Doug performed the first ever bare-skin burn stunt performance in a feature film. In a production video diary on the film website showing some of the preparation for the stunt, Doug quips to the camera, "It's not a good week unless you burn at least a couple of times."

Doug's character in the Industry Works's film Toxin by Tom Raycove - Lt. John Paxton - features as the perspective of a first-person shooter game for smartphones, Toxin: Zombie Annihilation - made by DisruptedLogic.

Chapman's fire burn live on stage at the 2007 World Stunt Awards was used as a front page banner for the 2014 website.

Award nominations
He was nominated for a Taurus World Stunt Award for Best Fire Stunt in 2004 for a stunt performed for the film Freddy vs. Jason (2003). He doubled for Robert Englund as Freddy Krueger in a full body burn and wire stunt. In the DVD production commentaries, Englund said of him, "I've a great stunt double on this, and Doug's really making me look good."

He was nominated for a Leo Award in 2013 for Best Stunt Coordination in a Motion Picture for Assault on Wall Street.

Filmography

References

External links
 Visited March 13, 2023.
Profile at Stunts Canada from Stunts Canada. Visited March 13, 2023.
Sergeant Cole profile from GateWorld. Visited March 13, 2023.
Somnolence at YouTube. Visited March 13, 2023.

Year of birth missing (living people)
Living people
California State University, Chico alumni
Canadian male film actors
Canadian male television actors
Canadian stunt performers
Stunt doubles